KBUN may refer to:

 KBUN (AM), a radio station (1450 AM) licensed to serve Bemidji, Minnesota, United States
 KBUN-FM, a radio station (104.5 FM) licensed to serve Blackduck, Minnesota